Femina Miss India 2017 was the 54th edition of the Femina Miss India beauty pageant held on 25 June 2017 at Yash Raj Films, Mumbai. Priyadarshini Chatterjee of Delhi crowned Manushi Chhillar of Haryana as her successor. Sana Dua of Jammu and Kashmir was crowned 1st Runner Up and Priyanka Kumari of Bihar was crowned 2nd Runner Up.

As Femina Miss India 2017, Manushi Chhillar  represented India at Miss World 2017 where she was crowned Miss World 2017. After the Femina Miss India 2017 pageant, Sana Dua, 1st Runner Up 2017, was announced as India's representative to Miss United Continents 2017 that was held in September 2017 in Ecuador, where she made it to the top 10. Priyanka Kumari, Femina Miss India 2nd Runner Up 2017, was announced as India's representative to Miss Intercontinental 2017 which was held on 25 January 2018  in Egypt, where she won the best national costume subtitle award. Anukriti Gusain, Femina Miss India Uttrakhand 2017, was announced as India's representative to Miss Grand International 2017 that was held on 25 October 2017 in Vietnam, where she placed in the top 20.

New Format 
This year saw a change in the format of the fbb Colors Femina Miss India contest, with the competition travelling to all 30 states of the country to hunt for the best talent from each state. The winners were mentored by four celebrities - 
 Neha Dhupia (North Zone)
 Parvathy Omnakuttan (South Zone)
 Dipannita Sharma (East Zone) 
 Waluscha de Sousa (West Zone) 
The state winners further participated in the grand finale of fbb Colors Femina Miss India 2017.The process started with auditioning Miss India aspirants from each state, where three girls from every state were selected to go forward to the zonal stage. The zonal ceremonies were held in Delhi (North Zone), Bengaluru (South Zone), Kolkata (East Zone) and Pune (West Zone). Each zonal ceremony had the three state finalists from the respective states under that zone competing for the state crown. The Femina Miss India Organisation has waved off the Bikini round for audition. So, there will be no Swimsuit competition for the aspirants this year onwards.

The organisation has also brought down the height criteria to 5.5" and above.

Results 
Color keys

Sub Title Awards

Best National Costume

Body Beautiful

Miss Active

Contestants
The following is the list of the official delegates of Miss India 2019 representing 30 states of the country:
Color key

Crossovers
Miss Diva
2019: Shefali Sood Miss Supranational India
2018: Aditi Hundia (Miss Diva - Supranational)
2018: Shefali Sood (Top 10)
2016:Srishti Vyakarnam (top11) 

Miss Asia Pacific World
2014: Anukriti Gusain (4th Runner up)

Miss Asia Pacific International
2016: Srishti Vyakaranam (Top 10)

Femina Miss India
2013: Anukriti Gusain(Top 5)
2016: Navpreet Kaur (Top 5)

Miss India Worldwide India
2014: Audrey D'Silva (2nd Runner up)

Hosts
 Karan Johar
 Ritesh Deshmukh

Judges
 Stephanie Del Valle - Miss World 2016
 Bipasha Basu - Bollywood Actress
 Arjun Rampal - Bollywood Actor
 Ileana D'Cruz - Bollywood Actress
 Abhishek Kapoor - Director and Producer
 Vidyut Jammwal - Bollywood Actor
 Manish Malhotra - Fashion Designer

Panelists
Personality Development Expert: Sanjeev Datta & Viram Datta
Make-Up Coach: Clint Fernandes
Fitness Partner: Samir and Namrata Purohit
Skincare Expert: Dr Jamuna Pai
Smile Care Expert: Dr Sandesh Mayekar
Fashion Director: Kavita Lakhani

References

External links

2017
2017 beauty pageants
June 2017 events in India